Makoto Kitayama (born 1952) is a Japanese musician, active since the late '60s, most notably as vocalist and songwriter for the progressive rock band Shingetsu.

After Shingetsu folded at the end of the seventies, Kitayama has released two solo albums: the instrumental, keyboard-dominated, "Doubutsukai No Chinou" in 1982 (re-released in 2004) and the progressive rock outing "Hikaru Sazanami" in 1998. "Practical Encyclopedia of Kingdom Plantae" was released in 2008, and is the second part of a planned trilogy that started with his debut solo album, inspired by a book series from 1932. He's helped here by Takashi HAYASHI, the leader and guitarist of Qui.

See also
Shingetsu

External links
"Detailed review" for Kitayama's "Practical Encyclopedia of Kingdom Plantae" album.
"Shingetsu's" discography, mp3 and reviews.
 official site with downloable mp3 and information.

1952 births
Living people
Japanese musicians
Place of birth missing (living people)
Musicians from Hokkaido